John Thompson (born October 16, 1955) is a former American football. He served as the head football coach at East Carolina University from 2003 to 2004 and at Arkansas State University on an interim basis twice—first during the 2013 GoDaddy.com Bowl and then in the 2014 GoDaddy Bowl. He has compiled a career college football coaching record of 5–20.

Coaching career
Thompson was hired by head coach Ed Orgeron, who played under Thompson at Northwestern State University. Thompson has also served as the defensive coordinator at the University of Southern Mississippi, the University of Alabama, the University of Arkansas, the University of Florida, Louisiana State University, Louisiana Tech, and the University of Memphis. From 2003 to 2004, he was the head football coach at East Carolina University.
 
His most recent coaching position, prior to Ole Miss, was as co-defensive coordinator at South Carolina, but he left to return to his alma mater, the University of Central Arkansas, as the athletic director. Thompson then accepted the position as defensive coordinator at Georgia State University. Thompson accepted the defensive coordinator position for the Arkansas State Red Wolves on February 25, 2012 under Head Coach Gus Malzahn. Thompson, his wife, Charleen, and two sons, Cabe and Hays, currently live in Alpharetta, Georgia outside of Atlanta.

Head coaching record

* Only coached bowl games

References

1955 births
Living people
American football defensive backs
Alabama Crimson Tide football coaches
Arkansas Razorbacks football coaches
Arkansas State Red Wolves football coaches
Central Arkansas Bears and Sugar Bears athletic directors
Central Arkansas Bears football players
Players of American football from El Paso, Texas
East Carolina Pirates football coaches
Florida Gators football coaches
Georgia State Panthers football coaches
LSU Tigers football coaches
Louisiana Tech Bulldogs football coaches
Memphis Tigers football coaches
Northwestern State Demons football coaches
Ole Miss Rebels football coaches
South Carolina Gamecocks football coaches
Southern Miss Golden Eagles football coaches
Texas State Bobcats football coaches
High school football coaches in Georgia (U.S. state)
People from St. Francis County, Arkansas
Sportspeople from El Paso, Texas